Khetag Gazyumov (also Gozyumov, Gozymty Ruslany fyrt Xetæg; , Khetag Ruslanovich Gozyumov; ; born 24 April 1983) is retired Russian  and Azerbaijani freestyle wrestler of Ossetian origin. Competing in the 96 some kg weight category he won bronze medals at the 2008 and 2012 Summer Olympics and a silver at the 2016 Rio Games. He also won four gold and four silver medal at the European and world championships in 2009–2014 and a gold medal at the 2015 European Games.

Gazyumov took up wrestling in 1990 and started competing in 1994. He eventually developed a cardiac arrhythmia, which led to his collapse after the quarterfinal match at the 2012 Olympics.

References

External links
 

Azerbaijani male sport wrestlers
Olympic wrestlers of Azerbaijan
Wrestlers at the 2008 Summer Olympics
Wrestlers at the 2012 Summer Olympics
Olympic bronze medalists for Azerbaijan
Ossetian people
1983 births
Living people
Olympic medalists in wrestling
Medalists at the 2012 Summer Olympics
Medalists at the 2008 Summer Olympics
Azerbaijani people of Ossetian descent
European Games gold medalists for Azerbaijan
Wrestlers at the 2015 European Games
European Games medalists in wrestling
World Wrestling Championships medalists
Sportspeople from North Ossetia–Alania
Olympic silver medalists for Azerbaijan
European Wrestling Championships medalists
20th-century Azerbaijani people
21st-century Azerbaijani people
World Wrestling Champions